An izba is a traditional Russian countryside dwelling. Often a log house, it forms the living quarters of a conventional Russian farmstead. It is generally built close to the road and inside a yard, which also encloses a kitchen garden, hay shed, and barn within a simple woven stick fence. Traditional, old-style izba construction involved the use of simple tools, such as ropes, axes, knives, and spades. Nails were not generally used, as metal was relatively expensive, and neither were saws a common construction tool. Both interior and exterior are of split pine tree trunks, the gap between is traditionally filled with river clay, not unlike the North American log cabin.

The dominant building material of Russian vernacular architecture, and material culture generally, for centuries was wood.  Specifically houses were made from locally-cut rough-hewn logs, with little or no stone, metal, or glass. Even churches and urban buildings were primarily wooden until the eighteenth century.

All of the building's components were simply cut and fitted together using a hand axe. Coins, wool, and frankincense were customarily placed beneath the corners of the house as an expression of the superstition that doing this would make the people living there healthy and wealthy.

From the fifteenth century on, the central element of the interior of izba was the Russian stove, which could occupy up to one quarter of the floorspace in smaller dwellings. Often there were no beds (in the Western sense) for many members of the household, as people would sleep directly on the plaster top of the oven, or on shelves built directly above the stove.

The outside of izbas was often embellished by various special architectural features, for example the rich wood carving decoration of windows. Such decorative elements and the use of the Russian stove are still commonly found in many modern Russian countryside houses, even though only the older wooden houses are called izbas today.

An alternative word for "izba" in Russian is "khata" (хата), which is the word in most Slavic languages for any cottage or small house (including Belarusian, Polish, and Ukrainian). According to historian of Russia Geoffrey Hosking, starting in the eighteenth century khata was used in to refer to cottages on the tree-poor southern steppes which used logs only for the framing, and then used wattle-and-daub as infill covered with a plaster and whitewash exterior. However, generally this wattle-and-daub house is called "mazanka" (мазанка) and khata is not necessarily a mazanka.

See also

 Log building

References

External links
 Russian izba's Full HD photos

Houses in Russia
Russian inventions
House types
Log buildings and structures